Jeffrey A. C. Nelson (born December 18, 1972) is a Canadian former professional ice hockey player who played in the National Hockey League (NHL). Jeff is the brother of Todd Nelson and Kerri Nelson-Brunen.

Playing career
Nelson was selected number thirty six overall by the Washington Capitals in the second round of the 1991 NHL Entry Draft. Nelson had very significant numbers in the last two years he played in the WHL notching 233 points in only 136 games.

However, Nelson was not able to translate that success to the NHL as he has toiled the majority of his career in the minor leagues. He did get a chance at the NHL when he played in 43 games for the Capitals between the 1994–95 NHL season and the 1995–96 NHL season.

After his very limited success with the Capitals he signed as a free agent with the expansion Nashville Predators on August 19, 1998. While in the Predators organization he played most of his games for the Predators' minor league affiliate the Milwaukee Admirals. However, he did get the chance to play 9 games in the Predators' inaugural season the 1998–99 NHL season. On June 22, 1999 the Predators traded him back to the Capitals for future considerations.

Career statistics

Awards
 WHL East Second All-Star Team – 1991 & 1992

External links

1972 births
Living people
Canadian ice hockey centres
Sportspeople from Prince Albert, Saskatchewan
Milwaukee Admirals players
Nashville Predators players
Portland Pirates players
Prince Albert Raiders players
Schwenninger Wild Wings players
Washington Capitals draft picks
Washington Capitals players
Ice hockey people from Saskatchewan
Canadian expatriate ice hockey players in Germany